Peptoniphilus is a genus of bacteria in the phylum Bacillota (Bacteria).

Etymology
The name Peptoniphilus derives from:New Latin noun peptonum, peptone; New Latin adjective philus from Greek adjective philos (φίλος) meaning friend, loving; New Latin masculine gender noun Peptoniphilus, friend of peptone, referring to the use of peptone as a major energy source.

Classification 
Peptoniphilus are gram positive anaerobic cocci that were formerly classified in the genus Peptostreptococcus. They are non-saccharolytic, use peptone as a major energy source and produce butyrate.

Clinical relevance 
This genus is part of the vaginal and gut microbiota. They have been reported to as present in diabetic skin and soft tissue infections, bone and joint infections, surgical site infections, chorioamnionitis and bloodstream infections. They are typically found as part of polymicrobial infections but are difficult to recover with usual clinical cultures. They have been increasingly reported with the more widespread use of 16S PCR and MALDI-TOF for identification. They are noted to be linked with an impairment of wound-healing in patients with diabetic foot ulcers if present in abundance during the initial infection.

Species
The genus contains 17 species (including basonyms and synonyms), namely
 P. asaccharolyticus 
 P. catoniae
 P. coxii
 P. duerdenii
 P. gorbachii
 P. harei 
 P. ivorii 
 P. koenoeneniae
 P. lacrimalis
 P. lacydonensis
 P. methioninivorax
 P. olsenii
 P. senegalensis
 P. stercorisuis
 P. timonensis
 P. tyrrelliae
 P. urinimassiliensis

See also
 Bacterial taxonomy
 List of bacterial vaginosis microbiota
 Microbiology

References 

Eubacteriales
Bacterial vaginosis
Bacteria genera